"Highway Star" is a song by the English rock band Deep Purple. It is the opening track on the band's sixth studio album Machine Head (1972) and is the fastest song in tempo on the album. It is characterised by long, classically-inspired guitar and organ solos.

History 
This song was born on a tour bus going to Portsmouth in 1971 when a reporter asked the band how they wrote songs. To demonstrate, guitarist Ritchie Blackmore grabbed an acoustic guitar and began playing a riff consisting of a single "G" repeated over and over, while vocalist Ian Gillan improvised lyrics over the top. The song was refined and was performed that same night. The song first appears on the 1972 LP Machine Head. The track remains one of the band's staples in live concerts, and was the set opener even before it was released on any album.

The very first live version released, recorded live for German TV program Beat-Club in September 1971, is featured on the History, Hits & Highlights '68–'76 DVD. It is the opening track on the live albums Nobody's Perfect (1988), Come Hell or High Water (1994), and From the Setting Sun… (In Wacken) (2015). The most famous live version is featured on the 1972 live album Made in Japan. The Guardian said, "Blackmore’s playing is like a force of nature on the Made in Japan version; those slashing chords in the intro, and that amazing solo featuring the distinctive neo-classical descending runs, combining the spirits of Bach and Jimi Hendrix."

Structure 
The structure of the song consists of a 35-second bass/guitar introduction, before the band launches into the thumping opening riff, which soon leads into the first vocals section (0:55). The first two verses are sung, then Jon Lord begins his organ solo (2:14). This part consists mostly of fast, arpeggiated notes with a late Baroque/Early Classical influenced feel and makes use of the harmonic minor scale. The organ solo lasts for about a minute, then Ian Gillan sings the third verse of the song (3:24). At the conclusion of the third verse, the guitar solo starts (4:04), and lasts for just under a minute and twenty seconds. Blackmore wanted a very Bach like sound and worked out the solo note by note over the chord progression Dm, Gm, C, A which itself was borrowed from Bach. Then, the fourth and final verse, which in the original recording is simply a repetition of the first verse, is sung, finishing around 6:10.
Depending on the version, there may be a 15-second-long exit section before the end of the song. When the song is played live, Gillan has been known to improvise its lyrics, as seen in the official video for the song.

The guitar solo would gain recognition when readers of Guitar World voted it No. 15 in their list of the "100 Greatest Guitar Solos".

Personnel

Deep Purple 
 Ian Gillan – vocals
 Ritchie Blackmore – electric guitar
 Roger Glover – bass
 Jon Lord – organ
 Ian Paice – drums

Production 
 Martin Birch – engineer, mixing
 Jeremy "Bear" Gee – assistant engineer
 Nick Watterton – technician, Rolling Stones Mobile Studio operator

Covers
The song was covered by the Gwar side project X-Cops in their 1995 album You Have the Right to Remain Silent..., with the lyrics changed to reflect the band's police brutality theme.

In 2012, a tribute album featuring cover songs from Deep Purple's Machine Head was released, titled Re-Machined: A Tribute to Deep Purple's Machine Head. On this album, a live recording of "Highway Star" was featured by rock supergroup Chickenfoot, as well as a version recorded by Glenn Hughes, Steve Vai, and Chad Smith.

In 2018, a cover by Cory Todd was used in the science fiction television series The Expanse, in the episode of season 3 "Delta-V". The lyrics of the song were rewritten in the mix of English and Belter Creole, a constructed language made for the TV series by Nick Farmer, that was used in the show by Belters, the inhabitants of the asteroid belt and outer planets. The lyrics were additionally adjusted to fit the in-universe setting, with the references to the car in the song being replaced with the spaceship. The full version of the song was later placed on The Collector's Edition version of the TV series soundtrack, that was realized on December 13, 2019.

Other bands to record the song include Dream Theater, Point Blank, Stryper, Metal Church, Buckcherry, Type O Negative, Faith No More.

References

Deep Purple songs
1972 songs
Songs written by Ritchie Blackmore
Songs written by Ian Gillan
Songs written by Roger Glover
Songs written by Jon Lord
Songs written by Ian Paice
Songs about cars